The Symphony in B-flat major ("Mannheim No. 3") is a symphony by Johann Stamitz, written in the style of the Mannheim school sometime from 1741 to 1746. It might be Stamitz' first symphony. It consists of three movements:
Alla breve
Andante
Allegro

It is about 8 minutes long.

See also
Symphony in G major "Mannheim No. 1" (Stamitz)
Symphony in A major "Mannheim No. 2" (Stamitz)

Notes

External links

Symphony B-flat major
Stamitz
Compositions in B-flat major